Boerhavia intermedia is a species of spiderling plant known by the common name five-wing spiderling. It is sometimes considered a subspecies of the common weed Boerhavia erecta. This spiderling is a fairly widespread annual herb of the southwestern United States and northern Mexico. It is somewhat variable in appearance, but in general it is loosely clumping, raising erect stems up to half a metre in height. It has lance-shaped, wavy-margined leaves and bears a branching inflorescence of clustered or singular flowers, each pale pink flower only one or two millimetres across. The clustered fruits that appear afterwards are tiny club-shaped, ridged achenes less than 3 mm long. This is a hardy plant, growing in arid, rocky, or disturbed areas, and often showing up as a roadside weed.

External links
 Calflora Database: Boerhavia triquetra var. intermedia (Fivewing spiderling) — formerly Boerhavia intermedia.
Jepson Manual eFlora (TJM2) treatment of Boerhavia triquetra var. intermedia  — formerly Boerhavia intermedia.
UC CalPhotos gallery of Boerhavia triquetra var. intermedia

intermedia
Flora of the Southwestern United States
Flora of the South-Central United States
Flora of Northwestern Mexico
Flora of the California desert regions
Flora of the Sonoran Deserts
Natural history of the Colorado Desert
Natural history of the Mojave Desert
Flora without expected TNC conservation status